The 1965 Cork Intermediate Football Championship was the 30th staging of the Cork Intermediate Football Championship since its establishment by the Cork County Board in 1909. The draw for the opening round fixtures took place on 31 January 1965. The championship ran from 18 April to 10 October 1965. It was the first championship to be completed since 1938.

The final was played on 10 October 1965 at Clonmult Memorial Park in Midleton, between Mitcheltown and St. Vincent's, in what was their first ever meeting in the final. Mitchelstown won the match by 2-08 to 1-05 to claim their fourth championship title overall and a first title in 36 years.

Results

Quarter-finals

Semi-finals

Final

References

Cork Intermediate Football Championship